Esther Hernández may refer to:

 Esther Hernandez (artist), performance and installation artist
 Esther Medina Hernández, Mexican potter

See also
 Ester Hernandez (born 1944), San Francisco-based Chicana visual artist